Kinmont Hoitsma (April 10, 1934 – September 30, 2013) was an American fencer. He competed in the individual and team épée events at the 1956 Summer Olympics. He later became a teacher. His partner Cecil Beaton died in 1980.

See also
List of Princeton University Olympians

References

External links
 

1934 births
2013 deaths
American male épée fencers
Gay sportsmen
Olympic fencers of the United States
Fencers at the 1956 Summer Olympics
People from Cooperstown, New York
American LGBT sportspeople
LGBT fencers
20th-century American people
21st-century American people